Hohenheim  is a neighborhood in Stuttgart, Germany.
The name can also refer to:
Hohenheim Castle
University of Hohenheim 

People and families carrying the toponymic surname "van Hohenheim" include:
Theophrastus von Hohenheim, better known as Paracelsus
Van Hohenheim, a character in the anime series and manga Fullmetal Alchemist based on Paracelsus
Bombast von Hohenheim, a Swabian noble family that went extinct in 1566
Franziska von Hohenheim, for whom the Swabian name and title was revived in 1774